The 1928 Detroit Tigers season was a season in American baseball. The team finished sixth in the American League with a record of 68–86, 33 games behind the New York Yankees.

Offseason 
 December 2, 1927: Heinie Manush and Lu Blue were traded by the Tigers to the St. Louis Browns for Harry Rice, Chick Galloway and Elam Vangilder.

Regular season

Season standings

Record vs. opponents

Roster

Player stats

Batting

Starters by position 
Note: Pos = Position; G = Games played; AB = At bats; H = Hits; Avg. = Batting average; HR = Home runs; RBI = Runs batted in

Other batters 
Note: G = Games played; AB = At bats; H = Hits; Avg. = Batting average; HR = Home runs; RBI = Runs batted in

Pitching

Starting pitchers 
Note: G = Games pitched; IP = Innings pitched; W = Wins; L = Losses; ERA = Earned run average; SO = Strikeouts

Other pitchers 
Note: G = Games pitched; IP = Innings pitched; W = Wins; L = Losses; ERA = Earned run average; SO = Strikeouts

Relief pitchers 
Note: G = Games pitched; W = Wins; L = Losses; SV = Saves; ERA = Earned run average; SO = Strikeouts

Farm system

Notes

External links 

1928 Detroit Tigers season at Baseball Reference

Detroit Tigers seasons
Detroit Tigers season
Detroit Tigers
1928 in Detroit